The Cleveland Hungarian Museum, located at 1301 East 9th Street in Cleveland, Ohio, protects and preserves the history of Hungarians in northeast Ohio, United States. Displays include Hungarian artwork, folk costumes and other items of Hungarian heritage. It is operated by the Cleveland Hungarian Heritage Society.

See also 
Cleveland Ukrainian Museum
Hungarian Ohioans

External links

References 

Ethnic museums in Ohio
Museums in Cleveland
Historical society museums in Ohio
Hungarian-American culture in Cleveland
European-American museums
Downtown Cleveland